Charles Nelson Pogue (15 September 1897 – 1985) was a Canadian mechanic and inventor who in the 1930s filed a series of US patents for a miracle carburetor (sometimes called the Winnipeg carburetor) that would enable a car to attain ; it was described as a vaporising carburetor or sometimes a catalytic carburetor. But the 1936 (or 1932?) announcement was not followed by any verifiable tests or demonstrations.

Description
The carburetor is described in several publicly available patents which have now expired, and there is no evidence that the patents were ever suppressed or that the rights were bought up by the oil industry, the motor industry, or the government.

A recent (2003) version of the story from Cornwall, England, has the original blueprints supposedly turning up in a secret compartment in a retired mechanic's toolbox. The story claims that the Toronto Stock Exchange "was rocked" in the 1930s (although no date or year is given), and that Pogue was given a job as manager of a factory (unnamed) making oil filters for the motor industry.

See also
Fuel saving device#Urban legend

References

External links 
 Mysterious Deaths: Tom Ogle, Inventor Borderlands (EPCC)

External links
Chapter III from The Fish Carbureter Book by Michael H. Brown (1982)
1936 photo of Charles Nelson Pogue (and interview, in small print)

1897 births
1985 deaths
Canadian inventors
Carburettors
20th-century American inventors